Kamavardhani (pronounced kāmavardhini – కామవర్ధిని/ ಕಾಮವರ್ಧಿನಿ/ காமவர்தினி / कामवर्धिनि) is a ragam in Carnatic music (musical scale of South Indian classical music). It is the 51st Melakarta rāgam in the 72 melakarta rāgam system of Carnatic music. It is also referred by the name Pantuvarāḷi, although purists prefer to designate it as Kamavardhini. It literally means "that which increases desire".

This rāgam is very popular with musicians who typically sing it in the beginning of a concert. It is called Kāshirāmakriya in the Muthuswami Dikshitar school. The Hindustani music equivalent of Kamavardhini is the Poorvi thaat/Puriya Dhanashree.

Structure and Lakshana 

It is the 3rd rāgam in the 9th chakra Brahma. The mnemonic name is Brahma-Go. The mnemonic phrase is sa ra gu mi pa dha nu. Its  structure (ascending and descending scale) is as follows (see swaras in Carnatic music for details on below notation and terms):
: 
: 
(the notes in this scale are shuddha rishabham, antara gandharam, prathi madhyamam, shuddha dhaivatham, kakali nishadham)

It is a sampoorna rāgam – a rāgam that has all seven swaras (notes). This rāgam differs from the 15th melakarta rāgam Mayamalavagowla, which is the rāgam taught to a beginner in Carnatic music, only by the madhyamam. Kamavard
ani is the prati madhyamam equivalent of Mayamalavagowla.

Janya rāgams 
It has a few minor janya rāgams (derived scales) associated with it. See List of janya rāgams for full list of rāgams associated with it.

Popular compositions 

 Guruvina Gulaamanaaguva Tanaka (also sung in Salagabhairavi) – Purandaradasa
 Harinama Jihveyolirabeku By Vyasatirtha
 Vitalayya Vitalayya By Jagannatha Dasa
 Ramanujare Namo By Kanakadasa
 Raghuvara Nannu, Shambo Mahadeva, Saramegani, Aparama bhakthi, Shobhaane,Vadaera Daivamu, Sundara daradeham, Ninne Nera Nammi, and Shiva Shiva Shiva Enarada – Thyagaraja
 Ennaganu Rama Bhajana – Bhadrachala Ramadasu
 Ramanatham Bajeham, Visalaksheem Visweseem, Senapathe Palayamam – Muthuswami Dikshitar,
 Ninnarul Iyambalagumo – Papanasam Sivan
 Sarasaksha Paripalaya Maamayi, Paripalaya Sarasiruha and Saroruhaasana (Navarathri sixth day krithi) – Swati Tirunal
 Magalahârathide Nēku, Mahitâtma Sevite – Kalyani Varadarajan
 Engum Nirainda Paramporule (varnam)- Madurai Sri N Krishnan
Sharanam tava – Mangalampalli Balamuralikrishna
Shankari Ninne – Mysore Vasudevachar
Kunjitha padhathai by Gopalakrishnabharathi
 Alli undidalaam vareer by Dandapani desikar

Film Songs

Language: Tamil

Related rāgams 
This section covers the theoretical and scientific aspect of this rāgam.

Kamavardani's notes when shifted using Graha bhedam, yields Kanakangi (the 1st melakarta). Graha bhedam is the step taken in keeping the relative note frequencies same, while shifting the shadjam to the next note in the rāgam. See further details and an illustration of Graha bhedam on Kanakangi.

Notes

References

Melakarta ragas